The University of Texas Health Science Center at San Antonio School of Nursing, is a tier one institute of higher education (the only one in South Texas). It is located on the main campus of University of Texas Health Science Center at San Antonio in San Antonio, Texas.

The school was ranked 40th nationally in 2010, and 32nd by NIH funding.

Education
The School has 13 Fellows of the American Academy of Nursing, and has 2 Centers of Excellence:
 The Academic Center for Evidence-Based Practice
 The Center for Community-Based Health Promotion with Women and Children

References

External links

 The official website of The Nursing School at UTHSCSA

University of Texas Health Science Center at San Antonio
Educational institutions established in 1969
Nursing schools in Texas
1969 establishments in Texas